Central Saanich is a district municipality in Greater Victoria, British Columbia, Canada , and a member municipality of the Capital Regional District. It is located on the Saanich Peninsula, in the far south-east of Vancouver Island.  The district began as a farming community, and many hobby farms, along with a handful of small working farms and vineyards, still exist.  In recent decades, the area has seen increasing residential, commercial, and industrial development, especially around the neighbourhoods of Brentwood Bay and Saanichton, which are occasionally referred to as separate communities.

The area's best-known tourist attractions are the Butchart Gardens, located in the Brentwood Bay area, Gowlland Tod Provincial Park, and Island View Beach.

The mayor of Central Saanich is former district councillor Ryan Windsor.  Municipal councillors last elected in 2022 include Niall Paltiel, Sarah Riddell, Zeb King, Bob Thompson, Gord Newton, and Christopher Graham.

Neighbourhoods of Central Saanich
 Brentwood Bay 
 Willis Point
 Island View
 Saanichton
 Keating
 Tanner Ridge (also Saanich)

Potato ban
The production of potatoes from Central Saanich, east of the West Saanich Road, was banned in 1982 due to infestation by the golden nematode. Potatoes from this region of Central Saanich are banned from entry into the United States.

Notable people
 Jamie Benn, ice hockey winger for the Dallas Stars of the National Hockey League (NHL).

 Wife and husband Lorna Crozier and Patrick Lane, both award-winning Canadian poets.
 Roy Sydney Baker-Falkner, grew up in Saanich in the 1920s and went on to be one of the top Second World War Naval Aviators from Canada and UK., and one of the few Canadians who took part in the Battle of Britain.

Demographics

Ethnicity

Religion 
According to the 2021 census, religious groups in Central Saanich included:
Irreligion (10,150 persons or 59.1%)
Christianity (6,365 persons or 37.1%)
Sikhism (270 persons or 1.6%)
Judaism (110 persons or 0.6%)
Buddhism (70 persons or 0.4%)
Islam (40 persons or 0.2%)
Hinduism (15 persons or 0.1%)
Other (150 persons or 0.9%)

See also

 Globodera rostochiensis#The golden nematode blight on the Saanich Peninsula

Notes

References

External links

Populated places on the British Columbia Coast
District municipalities in British Columbia
Populated places in the Capital Regional District
Greater Victoria
Saanich Peninsula
1950 establishments in British Columbia